Article 6 of the Paris Agreement on greenhouse gases enables Parties to cooperate in implementing their nationally determined contributions (NDCs) towards emission reduction. Among other things, this means that emission reductions can be transferred between countries and counted towards NDCs. Agreement on the provisions of Article 6 was reached after intensive negotiations lasting several years.

Overarching goals of Article 6 
Voluntary cooperation provided for under Article 6 of the Paris Agreement serves a number of goals. These are outlined below.

Raised ambition 
International cooperation under Article 6 is designed to raise ambition. With regard to climate action, this is generally understood as cooperation being used to enable the participating countries to achieve more ambitious emission reduction targets. Worthy of note here is that under the Paris Agreement, the idea of raised ambition is not restricted purely to climate change mitigation. It also includes measures and targets for climate change adaptation.

Supporting sustainable development 
The cooperation mechanisms must support sustainable development. While the main focus of cooperation is placed on avoiding greenhouse gas emissions, other sustainability issues must also be addressed.

Ensuring environmental integrity 
The cooperative mechanisms must also ensure the environmental integrity of the cooperation and transfer process. That means that the mechanisms may not be used to circumvent climate action ambition in the countries involved. For example, the transfer of emission reductions from one country to another must not lead to the countries’ respective climate action efforts being any less than they would be without the cooperative mechanism.

Three approaches to international cooperation 
The Paris Agreement offers three ways in which Parties may cooperate on a voluntary basis.

Article 6.2: Cooperative Approaches 
Article 6.2 enables Parties to cooperate with one another directly without using an international mechanism. For example, climate change mitigation activities can be implemented in one country and the resulting emission reductions can be transferred to another country and counted towards its nationally determined contribution (NDC).

In addition to the requirement to promote sustainable development and ensure environmental integrity, use of Article 6.2 also requires transparent processes and accurate accounting of emission reductions achieved. The latter is designed to prevent emission reductions being counted more than once – for example, towards the environmental audit of the country in which the climate action took place and also of the country to which the emission reductions were transferred.

Article 6.2 could be used in a situation where national or regional instruments such as the EU Emissions Trading Scheme (ETS) are linked with comparable systems in order to create a common, cross-border carbon market. National and bilateral carbon credit-based systems operated outside the realm of the UNFCCC could also be used under Article 6.2. At the climate change conference in Paris, a working programme was adopted to develop guidelines on using this cooperation form.

Article 6.4: Mechanism to promote climate action and support sustainable development 
Another approach to international cooperation involves the use of the newly-developed mechanism to contribute to the mitigation of greenhouse gas emissions and support sustainable development (Article 6.4). In contrast to the instruments used in direct bilateral cooperation, this mechanism is supervised by a body commissioned by the Conference of the Parties to the Paris Agreement (COP). The COP will also adopt rules, processes and procedures which must be complied with when implementing activities under Article 6.4 This will ensure that both design and implementation of climate change mitigation activities as well as the verification of the emission reductions achieved meet standardised requirements. As with bilateral cooperation under Article 6.2, emission reductions achieved with the Article 6.4 mechanism in one country can be transferred to another country and counted towards its NDC.

Like the other forms of cooperation under Article 6, these activities must contribute to raised ambition and support sustainable development. One particular feature of the mechanism contained in Article 6.4 is the explicit goal of contributing to global emission reductions (Article 6.4 (d)). The activities conducted under Article 6.4 should not therefore result in a simple zero-sum game, as was the case with the Clean Development Mechanism, its predecessor mechanism, and must instead lead to an absolute reduction in global greenhouse gas emissions overall.

Yet another feature of the mechanism is the goal of involving private sector stakeholders in climate change mitigation activities (Article 6.4 (b)). This will be done by offering suitable incentives. The approach gives non-state actors the opportunity to make use of the mechanism contained in Article 6.4.

Article 6.8: Non-market-based approaches 
As a third option, Article 6.8 allows the use of non-market-based approaches. As the name clearly suggests, market-based climate change mechanisms play no role whatsoever in this approach.

While the other two approaches focus on cooperation in implementing climate action, the range of opportunities for cooperation under Article 6.8 is significantly broader. In addition to climate action and climate change adaptation, they also cover technology transfer and capacity-building measures. How these approaches are to work has still to be agreed – the details will be fleshed out over the next few years in the development of a framework for non-market-based approaches.615304336404

Open issues and current negotiations 
In Paris, the Parties agreed on a rough framework and goals for the cooperative mechanisms. How these goals are to be achieved and how the mechanisms are expected to work remains unclear. Both are being addressed in the current climate change negotiations which are shaped by differing political standpoints and numerous open issues concerning technical matters, structure and design.

Open issues 
One key issue involves the extent to which activities conducted under Article 6 are to be regulated and monitored. While some countries (such as Brazil and also the EU) call for Article 6 activities to be subject to stringent rules and monitored and overseen by a centralised institution, others (such as Japan, China and India) would like to see greater flexibility.

Differing standpoints exist as to the scope of applicability of the mechanism to promote climate action and support sustainable development contained in Article 6.4. While some countries, including Brazil, would like to see a continuation of the project-based approach used under the CDM, others are in favour of a broader-based mechanism that also takes in programmes and sectoral approaches.

The situation in other areas is less clear: discussions are still underway as to what the non-market-based approach actually entails and how it can be distinguished from existing forms of cooperation. An element of progress has been made in this regard, for example with the identification of activities which could benefit from the approach, including the withdrawal of subsidies for fossil fuels.

Apart from the issues outline above, there are also technical matters that must be addressed. One such issue is the linkage of Article 6 with the transparency framework of the Paris Agreement and the reporting requirements regarding the use of Article 6. Hence, countries using Article 6 will have to submit an additional layer of information. Other issues include the establishment and use of robust accounting rules for transferred emission reductions. The differences in the nationally determined contributions (NDCs) submitted by Parties to the Paris Agreement highlight the challenges faced: to prevent transferred emission reductions from being counted more than once and thus undermining the environmental integrity of the Paris Agreement, reductions which are exported from one country and counted towards another country’s NDC must be deducted from the exporting country’s national emissions budget. However, if the two countries have differing NDCs, for example with differing target years, then robust accounting could well be rendered impossible. These and other technical matters must be clarified before the mechanisms can be used.

Outlook 
Following the adoption of the Paris Agreement, the task now at hand is to flesh out the details regarding the design and structure of the cooperation mechanisms. At the climate change conference in Marrakesh in 2016, Parties exchanged their views and opinions regarding the role of Article 6 and identified those areas in which a consensus had been reached and where a common understanding had still to be agreed. A key element in that process is the opportunity for Parties to submit their standpoint in the form of “submissions” to the UNFCCC. After the first round of submissions in the lead up to COP22, it was agreed in Marrakesh to introduce a further round of submissions which would be used as the basis for the next round of climate change negotiations during the interim sessions in Bonn. The submissions displayed a wide range of views, which challenged the negotiations on this issue at the UN Climate Change Conference in Bonn in November 2017. Although a large number of controversial topics and open issues remain even after the negotiations in Bonn, all the proposals are now available in written, structured form, showing where the key areas of consensus and contention are. At COP23, the co-chairs of the working group were tasked with producing an informal note, which were revised at the first part of the SBSTA negotiation session in Bonn (SBSTA 48) in April and May 2018. Parties agreed to use the revised informal notes to further advance the negotiations. Between now and spring 2018, these will be used to draft a proposal for a consolidated text which could take the negotiations a significant step further.

Time is of the essence in this regard: in Marrakesh, it was agreed that the Paris Agreement rule book should be adopted at COP 24 at the end of 2018 (Decision 1/CP.22, para 12).

References 

United Nations Framework Convention on Climate Change